Scolopsis is a genus of threadfin breams native to the Indian Ocean and the western Pacific Ocean.

Species
The currently recognized species in this genus are:
 Scolopsis affinis W. K. H. Peters, 1877 (Peters' monocle bream)
 Scolopsis aurata (M. Park, 1797) (yellowstripe monocle bream)
 Scolopsis bilineata (Bloch, 1793) (two-lined monocle bream)
 Scolopsis bimaculata Rüppell, 1828 (thumbprint monocle bream)
 Scolopsis ciliata (Lacépède, 1802) (saw-jawed monocle bream)
 Scolopsis frenata (G. Cuvier, 1830) (bridled monocle bream)
 Scolopsis ghanam (Forsskål, 1775) (Arabian monocle bream)
 Scolopsis igcarensis Mishra, S. Biswas, B. C. Russell, Satpathy & Selvanyagam, 2013 (Igcar monocle bream)
 Scolopsis lineata Quoy & Gaimard, 1824 (striped monocle bream)
 Scolopsis margaritifera (G. Cuvier, 1830) (pearly monocle bream)
 Scolopsis monogramma (G. Cuvier, 1830) (monogrammed monocle bream)
 Scolopsis taeniata (G. Cuvier, 1830) (black-streaked monocle bream)
 Scolopsis taenioptera (G. Cuvier, 1830) (lattice monocle bream)
 Scolopsis temporalis (G. Cuvier, 1830) (bald-spot monocle bream)
 Scolopsis trilineata Kner, 1868 (three-lined monocle bream)
 Scolopsis vosmeri (Bloch, 1792) (whitecheek monocle bream)
 Scolopsis xenochrous Günther, 1872 (oblique-barred monocle bream)

References 

 
Marine fish genera
Taxa named by Georges Cuvier